François Claude Pierre René Baroin (born 21 June 1965) is a French politician and lawyer who served as Finance Minister from 2011 to 2012, following a stint as Budget Minister in the government of Prime Minister François Fillon. A member of The Republicans (LR), he was a long-time ally of Jacques Chirac and has been Mayor of Troyes in Champagne since 1995.

Early life and education
Baroin was born in the 12th arrondissement of Paris to an upper-class family. His father Michel Baroin was a student friend of Chirac’s who went on to become a leading freemason, chairman of retailer Fnac and the insurer GMF, and a powerful local politician.

Baroin studied at Collège Stanislas de Paris before moving to ISG Business School and Panthéon-Assas University.

Early career
Baroin started his career as a political correspondent for Europe 1 from 1988 until 1992.

Political career
In 1992, at Chirac’s behest, Baroin joined his party Rally for the Republic (RPR). He became a member of the National Assembly in the 1993 elections – where he served on the Committee on Legal Affairs – and the mayor of Troyes, a mid-sized city west of Paris, two years later. 

Baroin was appointed Chirac’s campaign spokesman in the 1995 French presidential election. Following the elections, he became first state secretary and government spokesman under Prime Minister Alain Juppé and then, after a reshuffle, a political aide to the president.

Returning to parliament, Baroin was a member of the National Assembly's Finance Committee (1997-2001), the Committee on Cultural Affairs (2001-2002) and the Committee on Legal Affairs (2002-2005). He also served as the Assembly's vice-president between 2002 and 2005.

In the government led by Prime Minister Dominique de Villepin, Baroin served as Minister for Overseas Territories from June 2005 to March 2007 and was briefly Minister of the Interior from March to May 2007. He replaced Nicolas Sarkozy on 26 March 2007 as Interior Minister when Sarkozy left the Government to pursue his presidential candidacy. During his time as Minister of the Budget in the government of Prime Minister François Fillon from 2010 until 2011, Baroin successfully managed controversial dossiers such as wealth tax reform, the reduction of civil servants and the abolition of Sarkozy’s controversial tax cap for the rich.

On 29 June 2011, Baroin was appointed Minister for the Economy, Finance and Industry in Fillon’s cabinet, replacing Christine Lagarde following her appointment as Director General of the International Monetary Fund. At the time, he was one of three candidates discussed for the role, alongside Bruno Le Maire and Valérie Pécresse. The appointment was seen as a tribute to Baroin’s presumed ability to sell austerity to the French public and to unpick the economic policy of the opposition Socialist Party. During his brief time in office, he chaired the meetings of the Group of Eight ministers of finance when France held the group's presidency in 2011.

From 2014, Baroin served as president of the France's Mayors Organization (Association des Maires de France), a powerful organization for more than 36,000 mayors in France. 

Ahead of the 2017 French presidential election, Baroin played a central role in the campaign of François Fillon. After Fillon was eliminated in the first round of voting, Baroin declared that he would vote for Emmanuel Macron in the runoff election and that he would be available as prime minister in a cohabitation; however, Macron eventually chose Édouard Philippe for the post.

Career in the private sector
In 2018, Baroin joined the French investment banking business of Barclays as an external senior advisor. 

When Christian Jacob was elected chairman of the Republicans in 2019, he appointed Baroin as strategic advisor. In 2020, Baroin was mentioned by news media as potential candidate for the 2022 French presidential election; however, he declared in October 2020 that he would not run for president.

Other activities
 European Investment Bank (EIB), Ex-Officio Member of the Board of Governors (2011-2012)

Wiretapping by NSA
In 2015, WikiLeaks revealed that the U.S. National Security Agency wiretapped Baroin’s communication during his time as Minister of Finance.

Personal life
Baroin married fellow journalist Valérie Broquisse in 1991 and they have three children. Following their divorce, he was the partner of the journalist Marie Drucker until they separated in 2008. In 2009, he was linked with Michèle Laroque.

Overview

Governmental functions

Ministre of Economy, Finance and Industry : 2011–2012.

Government's Spokesman : 2010–2011.

Minister of Budget, Public Accounts and State Reform : 2010–2011.

Minister of Interior : March–May 2007.

Minister of Overseas Territories : 2005–2007.

Government's spokesman : May–November 1995.

Electoral mandates

Senate

Senator for Aube : since 2014.

National Assembly of France

Vice-president of the National Assembly of France : 2002–2005

Member of the National Assembly of France for Aube (3rd constituency) : 1993–1995 (Became government's spokesman in 1995) / 1997–2005 (Became minister in 2005) / 2007–2010 (Became minister in 2010) / 2012-2014 (elected as a senator). Elected in 1993, reelected in 1997, 2002, 2007, 2012.

Municipal Council

Mayor of Troyes : Since 1995. Reelected in 2001, 2008, 2014.

Municipal councillor of Troyes : Since 1995. Reelected in 2001, 2008, 2014.

Agglomeration community Council

President of the Agglomeration community of Troyes : Since 2001. Reelected in 2008, 2014.

Member of the Agglomeration community of Troyes : Since 2001. Reelected in 2008, 2014.

References

1965 births
French interior ministers
French lawyers
French Ministers of Finance
Government spokespersons of France
ISG Business School alumni
Living people
Mayors of places in Grand Est
People from Troyes
Paris 2 Panthéon-Assas University alumni
Politicians from Paris
Politicians of the French Fifth Republic
Rally for the Republic politicians
Union for a Popular Movement politicians
Deputies of the 11th National Assembly of the French Fifth Republic
Deputies of the 12th National Assembly of the French Fifth Republic
Deputies of the 13th National Assembly of the French Fifth Republic
Deputies of the 14th National Assembly of the French Fifth Republic
Senators of Aube